The Wicked Tinkers are an American Celtic music group who perform at many Scottish/Irish festivals.

History

The group was formed in the early 1990's when piper Aaron Shaw met bass drum player Warren Casey and percussionist John MacAdams at The Celtic Arts Center in Los Angeles, California. They have been a professional touring band since 1995. They play regularly at Scottish Festivals and Highland Games, and festivals have sometimes changed their dates to allow the Wicked Tinkers play for them. The band headlines at many Renaissance festivals as well, including the Northern California Renaissance Faire. They also have played many charity concerts including cancer benefits, and even a concert to support a Pregnant Mare Rescue horse sanctuary.

Aaron Shaw has been playing the bagpipes since 1976. He began attending the College of Piping Summer School in 1982, becoming an instructor there in 1996. Aaron has been a Piping Judge with WUSPBA since 2000 and, in addition to his private students, teaches at the California Summer School of Piping and Drumming and the Jim Thomson US School of Piping and Drumming and various seminars around the country.

Aaron Shaw has recorded bagpipes for  Bonnie Raitt on "Luck of the Draw". He also played for Owl on "The Right Thing" track called Rover about Chris Wyse's Irish connection. He played for Lee Dewyze on American Idol Season 9.

The band has evolved over the years. Keith Jones joined the band in 2000, playing snare drum and hand percussion. Keith is endorsed by Vic Firth drum sticks and many others.

In 2009, CJ Henderson replaced Jay Atwood on didgeridoo. Prior to becoming part of the band, CJ was a fan of the Wicked Tinkers and started learning didgeridoo because of the group. He was eventually invited to join the band. He also plays the Bronze Age Irish Horn.

Founding Member Warren Casey retired from the band in 2013, with the Reverend Dr. Tiki King taking his place. He was previously the Wicked Tinker's sound technician. Tiki King is an artist, founder of Ukuleles of Felton and a ukulele luthier.

Notable appearances include The Late Late Show with Craig Ferguson, during which, host Craig Ferguson accompanied them on a drum. Mixed martial arts fighter Keith Jardine has used their song "Bog" as entrance music in several UFC events. The band also appears in season 4 of the Cable TV show "Arrested Development". In 2017 the Wicked Tinkers competed on the Gong Show revival, episode 4, where they received a perfect 10 score. In 2018, the Wicked Tinkers were runner up in Good Times Santa Cruz's best local band category, and Tiki King was selected best musician 

In late January, 2023, the Wicked Tinkers became the target of a burglary.  Performance gear and tools, valued at an estimated $20,000, were stolen while being stored during the off season.  With only a few weeks before their tour season was to start, a GoFundMe account was created for donations.  Supporters responded my donating more than $27,500 in the first three days, significantly exceeding the initial $20,000 goal.  In response, the band appeared in several live online videos to express their gratitude and offer several online performances.  The strong support shown after an unfortunate setback demonstrates the group's popularity and their devoted fans' love for the band's continued success.

Current members

Aaron Shaw - great Highland bagpipe
The Reverend Dr. Tiki King - Big Drum, rhythm pole, Ukulele
CJ Henderson - didgeridoo, Bronze Age Irish Horn, bodhran

Guests

Members of the Celtic group Bad Haggis joined the Wicked Tinkers for performances at the 2005 and 2006 Seaside Games in Ventura, California.

Discography
Brutal (1997) (cassette)
Banned (1999) (cassette)
Wicked Tinkers (1999)
Hammered (2000)
Loud (2002)
Banger For Breakfast (2003)
Whisky Supper (2005)
Rant (2007)
Big Bottle Of Bad Ideas (2016)

References

Further reading
 Manna, Marcia. (June 13, 2004) The San Diego Union-Tribune "Highland fling: Wicked Tinkers re-create ancient Scottish songs." Section: Zone; Page N8.
 Baeza, Megan. (March 23, 2006) Anchorage Daily News "Celtic band bringing rock of Bronze Age. Wicked Tinkers: The group's first Alaska show on Saturday will benefit Highland Games." Section: Alaska; Page B5.
Gleason, Matt. (September 16, 2006) Tulsa World "Wicked pipes: California's Wicked Tinker cranks up the Scottish Festival."
Aguirre, Mary Lou. (January 12, 2007) The Fresno Bee "Hanford hosts Tempest and Tinkers in a Celtic romp." Section: South valley bee; Page 4.

External links
 Official website

Celtic music groups
Bagpipes